The 2000–01 season was Motherwell's 3rd season in the Scottish Premier League, and their 16th consecutive season in the top division of Scottish football.

Season review
In February, Ged Brannan joined Wigan Athletic and John Spencer was sold to Colorado Rapids.

On 2 March, Steve McMillan and Lee McCulloch both joined Wigan Athletic for a combined £1.25m.

On 16 March, Saïd Chiba joined Motherwell on loan from AS Nancy until the end of the season, whilst James Okoli joined from Watford on a contract also until the end of the season.

On 22 March, goalkeeper Andy Goram was loaned to Manchester United, for £100k, until the end of the season, and Don Goodman left on a free-transfer to sign for Walsall.

Squad

Out on loan

Transfers

In

Loans in

Out

Loans out

Released

Competitions

Premier League

League table

Results summary

Results by matchday

Results

Scottish Cup

League Cup

Squad statistics

Appearances

|-
|colspan="12"|Players away from the club on loan:

|-
|colspan="12"|Players who left Motherwell during the season:

|}

Goal scorers

Clean sheets

Disciplinary record

See also
 List of Motherwell F.C. seasons

References

2000-01
Scottish football clubs 2000–01 season